Brock Norman Brock (born October 1966) is a British screenwriter and playwright. Early in his career, his play Here is Monster was nominated for the Verity Bargate Award. The premiere production in 1990–91 was staged by the Show of Strength Theatre Company and directed by Mark Ravenhill.

Later, he ventured into screenwriting as the co-writer of Nicolas Winding Refn's critically acclaimed 2009 film Bronson. Since then, he has co-written 2018's Yardie and 2019's The Mustang.

He is a member of the Honourable Artillery Company, having served in the active unit in the 2000s.

References

Living people
1966 births
English screenwriters
English male screenwriters
English dramatists and playwrights
English male dramatists and playwrights
Place of birth missing (living people)
Writers from London